The happy hunting ground is a concept of the afterlife associated with Native Americans in the United States. The phrase most likely originated with Anglo-Saxon settlers' interpretation of the Indian description.

History
The phrase first appears in 1823 in The Pioneers by James Fenimore Cooper: 

Historian Charles L. Cutler suggests that Cooper "either coined or gave currency to" the use of the phrase "happy hunting ground" as a term for the afterlife. The phrase also began to appear soon after in the writing of Washington Irving.

In 1911, Sioux physician Charles Eastman wrote that the phrase "is modern and probably borrowed, or invented by the white man."

References

Lakota mythology
Afterlife places